Chu Hon Ming William (born July 16, 1971), known as William Chu, is a Macau football player and coach. He plays as a goalkeeper for clubs Hap Kuan, G.D. Lam Pak and G.D. Os Artilheiros.

Managerial career
He was appointed as the head coach of C.D. Monte Carlo from 2014 to 2016. He is currently the goalkeeper coach of Macau national team. He holds an AFC A Coaching License and AFC Advance Goalkeeping Coaching License.

Honours
Macau League Championship: 8 (1992, 1994, 1997, 1998, 1999, 2006, 2007, 2009)
Best Goalkeeper of the season, Best IX of the season (2010)

International career

References

External links

1971 births
Living people
Macau footballers
Macau international footballers
G.D. Lam Pak players
Macau football managers
Association football goalkeepers
Place of birth missing (living people)